Lerbäcken is a residential area in Luleå, Sweden. It had 1,082 inhabitants in 2010.

References

External links
Lerbäcken at Luleå Municipality

Luleå